Unfortunate Events may refer to:
A Series of Unfortunate Events, a book series by Lemony Snicket
Lemony Snicket's A Series of Unfortunate Events, a 2004 film
A Series of Unfortunate Events (TV series)
Unfortunate events in the front seats of the ring of Madrid, and the death of the mayor of Torrejón, an etching by Francisco Goya